The 2010–11 season was Football Club Internazionale Milano's 102nd in existence and 95th consecutive season in the top flight of Italian football.

The team took part in the Serie A, UEFA Champions League and the Coppa Italia, as titles holders of all these competitions. Internazionale won the Supercoppa Italiana against Roma, and Club World Cup against TP Mazembe, but lost the UEFA Super Cup to Atlético Madrid.

Season overview
 Departure of Mourinho and arrival of Benítez
Less than a week after winning the Champions League, on 28 May, Inter manager José Mourinho left the club and joined Real Madrid. On the 10 June, Inter signed Rafael Benítez from Liverpool on a two-year contract, ending a six-year stint as manager of the English side.

 Summer transfer window
During the summer transfer window, Inter signed Luca Castellazzi from Sampdoria, and also bought the entire rights to Jonathan Biabiany from Parma. After spending his last two seasons with Vasco da Gama in Brazil, Philippe Coutinho returned to Inter. Inter sold Ricardo Quaresma to Beşiktaş and Mario Balotelli to Manchester City, as well as also sold half of the rights to Rene Krhin to Bologna, Andrea Mei to Piacenza, and sent on one-year loan Vid Belec to Crotone, Victor Obinna to West Ham United and Andrea Ranocchia to Genoa after brought the half of his contract.

 World Cup
Meanwhile, during 2010 World Cup in South Africa ten players from Inter were included in their national teams, these players were Walter Samuel and Diego Milito with Argentina; Rene Krhin with Slovenia; Dejan Stanković as a captain of Serbia; Sulley Muntari with Ghana; Wesley Sneijder with the Netherlands; Samuel Eto'o as a captain of Cameroon; and Júlio César, Maicon, and Lúcio as a captain with Brazil. The Netherlands, including Wesley Sneijder, reached and lost the final match of the tournament against Spain after extra time.

 Completing the Treble
Inter starts their season with a win over Roma in Supercoppa Italiana, to secure their first trophy of the season. Six days later Inter lost to Atlético Madrid in UEFA Super Cup, this defeat meant Inter lost their chance to collect six trophies in the same year, as Barcelona had done the year before. In December, Inter claimed the FIFA Club World Cup for the first time after a 3–0 win against TP Mazembe in the final.

 Departure of Benítez and arrival of Leonardo
After this win, however, on 23 December, due to his poor performance in Serie A and separated by 13 points from the leader Milan, Inter announced on its website the departure of Rafael Benítez to be replaced by Leonardo the following day.

 Leonardo's impact in January
Leonardo has huge impact on the team even with the absence of Samuel Eto'o due to suspension, and Wesley Sneijder and Júlio César due to injury. Inter won their match against Napoli with two goals from Thiago Motta and another one form Esteban Cambiasso. Inter continues their good start with Leonardo with five wins in row in all competitions, until they lost against Udinese, but Inter got in their feet quickly by qualifying to the semifinal of Coppa Italia and winning against Palermo after great comeback from 0–2 to win with 3–2 and two goals from new signing Giampaolo Pazzini.

 Winter transfer window
Meanwhile, the winter transfer window for Inter was busy with transfers. Due to the long-term injury of Walter Samuel, Inter bought the remainder of Andrea Ranocchia's contract from Genoa to become Leonardo's first signing. On 13 January, Mancini left the club to join Atlético Mineiro. On 28 January, Inter announced the signing of Giampaolo Pazzini from Sampdoria, as part of the deal that saw Jonathan Biabiany join Sampdoria. The next day, Houssine Kharja joined Inter on a loan deal from Genoa with option to sign permanently, while Sulley Muntari joined Sunderland on loan. On the last day of winter transfer window, Inter sent Nelson Rivas to Dnipro Dnipropetrovsk on loan, and brought Yuto Nagatomo from Cesena as part of the deal that sent Davide Santon in the opposite direction, also on loan. Both Joel Obi and Nwankwo Obiora signed co-ownership by Parma, however Obi will remain with Inter and Nwankwo will spend the rest of the season with Parma. Inter also signed Marco Andreolli from Chievo in co-ownership, and will remain at Chievo the rest of the season.

Awards 

 Individual

italic: nominated

 Team

italic: nominated

Key dates 

 2010
 28 May: Inter and Real Madrid presidents Massimo Moratti and Florentino Pérez reach agreement over manager José Mourinho, which saw the Portuguese coach moving to Real Madrid in a four-year deal.
 10 June: Rafael Benítez signed a two-year contract that will run until 30 June 2012.
 13 June: Inter and Beşiktaş agreed a transfer fee in the region of €7.3 million for Ricardo Quaresma.
 15 June: Inter presents new coach Rafael Benítez at the Angelo Moratti Sports Centre.
 17 June: Luca Castellazzi, formerly of Sampdoria, joined Inter, signing a two-year contract until 2012 with the option of a one-year extension.
 25 June: McDonald Mariga and Jonathan Biabiany joined Inter permanently from Parma.
 29 June: Paolo Orlandoni signed a one-year deal, which extended his contract with Inter until 30 June 2011.
 6 July: Vid Belec joined Crotone on loan until 30 June 2011.
 7 July: Francesco Toldo announced his retirement from football.
 21 July: Andrea Ranocchia joined Inter, the former defender of Genoa, signed a five-year co-ownership contract until 2015. Ranocchia, however, will remain at Genoa for the 2010–11 season.
 27 July: Inter and Bologna agreed a co-ownership deal for Rene Krhin, allowing him to play for the club during the 2010–11 season.
 31 July: Luca Castellazzi and Philippe Coutinho made their debut for Inter against Manchester City
 3 August: Philippe Coutinho scored his first goal for Inter against Panathinaikos
 9 August: Javier Zanetti signed a two-year extended his deal, which extended his contract with Inter until 30 June 2013.
 9 August: Diego Milito signed a one-year extended his deal, which extended his contract with Inter until 30 June 2014.
 13 August: Inter and Manchester City agreed a transfer fee in the region of €30 million for Mario Balotelli.
 21 August: Inter won the Supercoppa Italiana for the fifth time, defeating Roma in the final 3–1.
 27 August: Inter sent Victor Obinna to West Ham United on one-year loan.
 27 August: Inter lose 2–0 to Atlético Madrid in UEFA Super Cup.
 28 October: Wesley Sneijder signed a two-year extended his deal, which extended his contract with Inter until 30 June 2015.
14 November: The 46 home matches unbeaten streak in Serie A was ended by losing the Derby della Madonnina
 18 December: Inter won the FIFA Club World Cup for the first time, defeating TP Mazembe in the final 3–0.
 23 December: Inter and Rafael Benítez reach agreement over separating by mutual agreement
 24 December: Leonardo appointed as Inter new coach, and signed a contract that will run until 30 June 2012.
 29 December: Inter and Massimo Moratti officially presents their new coach Leonardo at the Angelo Moratti Sports Centre.

 2011

 3 January: Andrea Ranocchia signed a deal until June 2015.
 12 January: Mancini (Brazilian footballer) joined Atlético Mineiro permanently from Inter.
 19 January: Javier Zanetti overtake Inter's legend Giuseppe Bergomi in Serie A appearances
 28 January: Giampaolo Pazzini signed a deal until June 2015, as part of the deal Jonathan Biabiany joined Sampdoria.
 29 January: Houssine Kharja joined Inter on a loan deal with option to sign permanently in June 2011.
 29 January: Sulley Muntari joined Sunderland on a loan deal until the end of the season.
 31 January: Nelson Rivas joined Dnipro Dnipropetrovsk on a loan deal until the end of the season, with option to sign permanently.
 31 January: Yuto Nagatomo joined Inter on loan as part of the deal Davide Santon moved to Cesena on loan also until the end of the season
 31 January: Joel Obi and Nwankwo Obiora signed co-ownership by Parma, however Obi will remain with Inter and Nwankwo will spend the remainder of the season with Parma.
 31 January: Inter signed Marco Andreolli from Chievo in a co-ownership deal; however, he will remain at Chievo for the remainder of the season.

Players

Squad information

From youth squad

Transfers

In

Total spending:  €34.5 million

Out

Total income: €67,100,000 

Net Income: €26,600,000

Out on loan, co-ownership deals 

 Updated 29 January 2011

 L=Serie A
 C=Coppa Italia, Super Cup
 E=Europe
 W=World

Club

 Coaching staff

 Medical staff

 Rehabilitation staff

Pre-season and friendlies

TIM Trophy

Other friendlies

Competitions

Overview

Serie A

League table

Results summary

Results by round

Matches

Coppa Italia

Supercoppa Italiana

UEFA Champions League

Group stage

Knockout phase

Round of 16

Quarter-finals

UEFA Super Cup

FIFA Club World Cup

Statistics

Squad statistics
{|class="wikitable" style="text-align: center;"
|-
!
!Total
! Home
! Away
! Neutral
|-
|align=left| Games played || 45 || 21 || 21 || 3
|-
|align=left| Games won || 26 || 16 || 8 || 2
|-
|align=left| Games drawn || 8 || 3 || 5 || 0
|-
|align=left| Games lost || 11 || 2 || 8 || 1
|-
|align=left| Biggest win || 4–0 (vs. Bari)  4–0 (vs. Werder Bremen) || 4–0 (vs. Bari)  4–0 (vs. Werder Bremen) || 3–0 (vs. Bari) || 3–0 (vs. Seongnam Ilhwa Chunma)  3–0 (vs. TP Mazembe)
|-
|align=left| Biggest loss || 0-3 (vs. Werder Bremen)  0–3 (vs. Milan || 0–1 (vs. Milan)  0–1 (vs. Bayern Munich) || 0–3 (vs. Werder Bremen)  0–3 (vs. Milan || 0–2 (vs. Atlético Madrid)
|-
|align=left| Biggest win (League) || 4–0 (vs. Bari) || 4–0 (vs. Bari) || 3–0 (vs. Bari) || N/A
|-
|align=left| Biggest win (Cup) || 3–1 (vs. Roma) || 3–1 (vs. Roma) || N/A || N/A
|-
|align=left| Biggest win (Europe) || 4–0 (vs. Werder Bremen) || 4–0 (vs. Werder Bremen) || – || –
|-
|align=left| Biggest win (Worldwide) || 3–0 (vs. Seongnam Ilhwa Chunma)  3–0 (vs. TP Mazembe) || colspan=2|N/A || 3–0 (vs. Seongnam Ilhwa Chunma)  3–0 (vs. TP Mazembe)
|-
|align=left| Biggest loss (League) || 0–3 (vs. Milan || 0–1 (vs. Milan) || 0–3 (vs. Milan|| N/A
|-
|align=left| Biggest loss (Cup) || – || – || N/A || N/A
|-
|align=left| Biggest loss (Europe) || 2–5 (vs. Schalke 04) || 2–5 (vs. Schalke 04) || 0–3 (vs. Werder Bremen) || 0–2 (vs. Atlético Madrid)
|-
|align=left| Biggest loss (Worldwide) || – || colspan=2|N/A || -
|-
|align=left| Clean sheets || 14 || 6 || 6 || 2
|-
|align=left| Goals scored || 83 || 53 || 24 || 6
|-
|align=left| Goals conceded || 54 || 24 || 28 || 2
|-
|align=left| Goal difference || +29 || +29 || –4 ||+4
|-
|-
|-
|align=left| Points || 86/135 (%) || 51/63 (%) || 29/63 (%) || 6/9 (%)
|-
|align=left| Winning rate || 26/45 (%) || 16/20 (%) || 8/21 (%) || 2/3 (%)
|-
|align=left| Most appearances || 42 || align=left colspan=3|  Samuel Eto'o
|-
|align=left| Most minutes played || 3927 || align=left colspan=3|  Samuel Eto'o
|-
|align=left| Top scorer || 36 || align=left colspan=3|  Samuel Eto'o
|-
|align=left| Top assister || 14 || align=left colspan=3|  Samuel Eto'o

 Under Rafael Benítez
{|class="wikitable" style="text-align: center;"
|-
!
!Total
! Home
! Away
! Neutral
|-
|align=left| Games played || 25 || 11 || 11 || 3
|-
|align=left| Games won || 12 || 7 || 3 || 2
|-
|align=left| Games drawn || 6 || 3 || 3 || 0
|-
|align=left| Games lost || 7 || 1 || 5 || 1
|-
|align=left| Clean sheets || 9 || 4 || 3 || 2
|-
|align=left| Goals scored || 41 || 25 || 10 || 6
|-
|align=left| Goals conceded || 28 || 10 || 16 || 2
|-
|align=left| Goal difference || +13 || +15 || –6 ||+4
|-
|-
|-
|align=left| Points || 42/75 (%) || 24/33 (%) || 12/33 (%) || 6/9 (%)
|-
|align=left| Winning rate || 12/25 (%) || 7/11 (%) || 3/11 (%) || 2/3 (%)

 Under Leonardo
{|class="wikitable" style="text-align: center;"
|-
!
!Total
! Home
! Away
! Neutral
|-
|align=left| Games played || 20 || 10 || 10 || 0
|-
|align=left| Games won || 14 || 9 || 5 || 0
|-
|align=left| Games drawn || 2 || 0 || 2 || 0
|-
|align=left| Games lost || 4 || 1 || 3 || 0
|-
|align=left| Clean sheets || 4 || 1 || 3 || 0
|-
|align=left| Goals scored || 42 || 28 || 14 || 0
|-
|align=left| Goals conceded || 26 || 14 || 12 || 0
|-
|align=left| Goal difference || +16 || +14 || +2 || 0
|-
|-
|-
|align=left| Points || 44/60 (%) || 27/30 (%) || 17/30 (%) || 0/0 (%)
|-
|align=left| Winning rate || 14/20 (%) || 9/10 (%) || 5/10 (%) || 0/0 (%)

Appearances and goals 

 Updated on 2 April 2011

 GS=Games started
 App.=Appearances
 Min.=Minutes

Starting 11
Considering starts in all competitions
As of 2 April

Goalscorers

Last updated: 29 May 2011

Disciplinary record

 Updated on 2 April 2011

Goals conceded 

 Updated on 2 April 2011

Own goals
 Updated on 14 September 2010

Suspensions during the season 

Last updated: April 2, 2011

Injuries during the season 

Last updated: April 2, 2011

Back in action

References

External links
Official website

2010-11
Internazionale
Inter Milan
FIFA Club World Cup-winning seasons